The Matrix Comics is a set of comics and short stories based on The Matrix film series and written and illustrated by figures from the comics industry. One of the comics was written by the Wachowskis and illustrated by the films' concept artist Geof Darrow. The comics and stories were originally presented for free on the Matrix series' website between 1999 and 2003. One of them was printed in 1999 to be given away at theaters as a promotional item for The Matrix, but Warner Bros. recalled it due to its mature content. Most of them were later republished by the Wachowskis' Burlyman Entertainment, along with some new stories and updates with color to some of the existing ones, in two printed trade paperback volumes in 2003 and 2004 and a deluxe hardcover twentieth anniversary edition in 2019.

By September 2004, the first printed volume had sold over 60,000 copies.

Contents 
Based on the 20th anniversary edition, the following comics were published:

 Bits and Pieces of Information by Lana & Lilly Wachowski and Geof Darrow
 Sweating the Small Stuff by Bill Sienkiewicz
 A Life Less Empty by Ted McKeever
 Goliath by Neil Gaiman, Bill Sienkiewicz, Gregory Ruth
 Burning Hope by John Van Fleet     
 Butterfly by Dave Gibbons     
 A Sword of a Different Color by Troy Nixey
 Get It? by Peter Bagge     
 There Are No Flowers in the Real World by David Lapham
 The Miller's Tale by Paul Chadwick
 Artistic Freedom by Ryder Windham and Kilian Plunkett     
 Hunters and Collectors by Gregory Ruth     
 An Easy One by Tommy Lee Edwards
 Farewell Performance by Jim Krueger, Tim Sale     
 Déjà Vu by Paul Chadwick
 System Freeze by Poppy Z. Brite, Dave Dorman, Michael Kaluta
 The King of Never Return by Ted McKeever     
 An Asset to the System by Troy Nixey     
 A Path Among Stones by Gregory Ruth     
 Run, Saga, Run by Keron Grant, Rob Stull
 Wrong Number by Vince Evans
 Broadcast Depth by Bill Sienkiewicz
 Who Says You Can't Get Good Help These Days? by Peter Bagge
 Saviors by Spencer Lamm, Michael Oeming
 I Kant by Kaare Andrews
 Day In... Day Out by Ted McKeever, Keron Grant
 Return of the Prodigal Son by Gregory Ruth 
 Let It All Fall Down by Paul Chadwick

Collected editions 

 The Matrix Comics, Vol. 1 by various (Burlyman Entertainment, 2003) 
 The Matrix Comics, Vol. 2 by various (Burlyman Entertainment, 2004) 
 The Matrix Comics: 20th Anniversary Edition by various (Burlyman Entertainment, 2019)

References 

The Matrix (franchise) mass media
American comics titles
Comics based on films